The 1921 Fordham Maroon football team was an American football team that represented Fordham University as an independent during the 1921 college football season. In its second season under coach Joseph DuMoe, Fordham compiled a 4–3–2 record. Fordham's media guide claims a record of 5–3–1, listing the result against Villanova as a 20–19 victory.

Schedule

References

Fordham
Fordham Rams football seasons
Fordham Maroon football